Ronald Warisan (born 15 September 1989) is a Papua New Guinean footballer who plays as a goalkeeper for Lae City FC in the Papua New Guinea National Soccer League.

Club career
After playing for several clubs in his country, Warisan Joined Lae City Dwellers FC in 2014. During the 8th round of the 2015 National Soccer League, He scored the final goal for Lae in the 6–0 defeat of Oro FC on 11 April 2015.

International career
Warisan made his senior international debut in a friendly match against Singapore on September 6, 2014.

He was named to Papua New Guinea's squad for the 2016 OFC Nations Cup and played in all five matches of the tournament.

International career statistics

Honours

Club
Lae City Dwellers
Papua New Guinea National Soccer League: 
Champions: 2015, 2015-16

References

External links

1989 births
Living people
Papua New Guinean footballers
2016 OFC Nations Cup players
Association football goalkeepers
Papua New Guinea international footballers